Ahmed Manaa Al-Noobi (born 9 April 1988), commonly known as Ahmed Manaa, is an Omani footballer who plays for Dhofar S.C.S.C. in Oman Professional League.

Club career
On 7 June 2014, he signed a one-year contract with Salalah based club, rivals of his former club Dhofar S.C.S.C., Al-Nasr S.C.S.C.

Club career statistics

International career
Ahmed was selected for the national team for the first time in 2007. Ahmed made his first appearance for Oman on 26 March 2008 against Thailand in the Third Round of 2010 FIFA World Cup qualification. He has made appearances in the 2011 AFC Asian Cup qualification and in the 2010 FIFA World Cup qualification and has represented the national team in the 2009 Gulf Cup of Nations.

Goals for Senior National Team
Scores and results list Oman's goal tally first.

Honours

Club
With Dhofar
Omani League (0): Runner-up 2007–08, 2008–09, 2009–10
Sultan Qaboos Cup (2): 2006, 2011; Runner-up 2009
Omani Federation Cup (1): 2012
Oman Super Cup (0): Runner-up 2012

National Team
Gulf Cup of Nations (1): 2009

References

External links

Ahmed Manaa at Goal.com

1988 births
Living people
People from Salalah
Omani footballers
Oman international footballers
Association football midfielders
Dhofar Club players
Al-Nasr SC (Salalah) players
Oman Professional League players